The Army Heritage Center Foundation (AHCF) is a membership-based 501(c)(3) nonprofit corporation that is coordinating a public-private partnership to assist the United States Army to develop the U.S. Army Heritage and Education Center (USAHEC) in Carlisle, Pennsylvania.

The foundation's charter is to ensure construction of two of the center's four facilities and to develop and sustain educational resources and outreach programs. The foundation's other partners include the Commonwealth of Pennsylvania, local governments, corporations, and private citizens. The foundation originated in 1997 and was incorporated in 1999 as the Military Heritage Foundation. In 2002, after Secretary of the Army Thomas White announced the creation of USAHEC, the foundation assumed the Doing Business As name Army Heritage Center Foundation to reflect its primary focus in building support for this project. In developing the USAHEC, the foundation works with the Army to create a complex that will honor Soldiers and their families; preserves and makes available for study their artifacts, manuscripts, personal papers, photos and art; and fosters a greater awareness of the United States and U.S. Army history.

In 2010, the AHCF completed construction of Phase One of the Visitor and Education Center at USAHEC. The foundation is currently fundraising to build Phase Two, which will house additional gallery space and meeting room spaces. Once the Visitor and Education Center and the Army Heritage Museum are constructed, the foundation will concentrate on providing margin of excellence support to enhance the visitor experience and to develop innovative educational programs. The foundation also offers memberships and commemorative bricks and pavers.

Educational programs 

The Education Department develops educational materials based on the holdings of the Army Heritage and Education Center.  These materials focus on the contributions of the American Soldier to the history and heritage of the United States and the world.  They include CD-ROMs, a book and DVD set entitled Army Nurses of World War One: Service Beyond Expectations, and content on the Education section of the foundation's website.

The AHCF honors Russell F. Weigley, a Temple University History Department faculty member from 1930 to 1966 who was considered to be one of the nation's top military historians, with a financial award for the best paper with a military history focus that is presented at the annual Barnes Club Conference in Philadelphia.

The Education Department works with local school districts to build an oral history program to train and assist high school and middle school students and teachers to interview veterans to collect their oral histories.

Other programs include a summer camp for youth, a youth leadership program, Veterans' breakfasts, and commemorative events.

The Education Director serves as the State Coordinator for National History Day in Pennsylvania.

Publications 

To supplement AHEC's educational programming, the foundation has produced the following publications, all of which are available in the Museum Store at AHEC, which the foundation also operates.

The Eye of the Army: A Photographic Exhibit

This is an interactive, educational CD-ROM that brings American history from the 1850s to the 1960s alive through images from the Military History Institute and artifacts from the U.S. Army Heritage and Education Center.

Defending the Long Road to Freedom

This is an interactive CD-ROM focusing on the African American community's experience within the U.S. Army. The centerpiece of the story is the 50-year Army career of Brigadier General Benjamin O. Davis Sr., the first African American promoted to General Officer rank in the United States Armed Forces.

Army Nurses of World War One: Service Beyond Expectations

More than 21,000 women enlisted in the U.S. Army during World War I to serve as uniformed nurses. Nearly half of them served in overseas locations. Their little-known story is presented through the writings of two of these brave women, Elizabeth Lewis and Emma Elizabeth Weaver.

Designing for Victory 1914-1945

This educational CD-ROM examines the role of posters as vital tools of communication on the home front during World War I and World War II. The disk includes a selection of vintage posters from both wars and features designs from the United States, as well as Germany, Great Britain, France, Canada, and Russia.

Service in the 195th Pennsylvania Infantry Regiment: The Diary of Captain Samuel McPherran

Having served two years in the Army and being discharged due to injury, McPherran recruited men from Huntingdon County, Pennsylvania, and joined them in the 195th in the fall of 1864. This booklet is a transcription of the diary he kept during his service in the 195th, along with annotations.

Understanding War Through Imagery: The Civil War in American Memory

This photograph booklet is a companion piece for the Civil War photograph exhibit on display in Ridgway Hall. The majority of the photographs are culled from the AHCF's expansive MOLLUS Civil War photo collection.

References

External links
 Army Heritage Center Foundation official website

Heritage Center Foundation